The Hotel President, formerly the President Hotel, is a historic hotel in Kansas City, Missouri, United States. It is now operated as the Hilton President Kansas City by Jury Hotel Group of Overland Park Kansas, and is located at 1327-35 Baltimore Avenue.

History
The President Hotel was built and completed in 1926 by Niagara Falls businessman Frank A. Dudley and operated by the United Hotels Company. The hotel was built in a construction boom that also saw the erection of the nearby Mainstreet Theater, Midland Theatre, and Kansas City Power and Light Building.

In 1928, it was the headquarters for the 1928 Republican National Convention, which nominated Herbert Hoover for President. The hotel's Drum Room lounge attracted entertainers from across the country, including Frank Sinatra, Benny Goodman and Marilyn Maye.

At the beginning of 1935 a man, using an assumed name at the time but later identified as Artemus Ogletree, was found severely assaulted in room 1046 after a two-day stay marked by odd behavior and interactions with a mysterious "Don"; he later died in the hospital. The case remains unsolved.

The hotel closed its doors in 1980. It later underwent a $45.5 million restoration by developer Ron Jury and reopened in 2005 as the Hilton President Kansas City.  The hotel is managed by Jury Hotel Group of Overland Park, Kansas.  The hotel’s General Manager is Philip Strnad.

Additional renovations were completed in 2017.  These renovations included all guest rooms and meeting rooms.  The acclaimed Presidential Suite, and Reagan suites were renovated in 2019.

The President Hotel is the only hotel located in the Power and Light District.

The President is a franchise hotel of Hilton Hotels of Bethesda, Maryland.

The Hotel President was placed on the National Register of Historic Places in 1983.

References

External links

Hilton President Kansas City official website
Hilton President Kansas City at Emporis.com

Hotels in Kansas City, Missouri
Hotel buildings completed in 1926
Hotel buildings on the National Register of Historic Places in Missouri
United Hotels Company of America
National Register of Historic Places in Kansas City, Missouri
Downtown Kansas City
1926 establishments in Missouri